Bleptina sangamonia is a species of moth of the family Erebidae first described by William Barnes and James Halliday McDunnough in 1912. It is found in the US from Illinois and Maryland, south to at least South Carolina, but it is not present in Pennsylvania, New Jersey and Delaware.

External links

Herminiinae